Helen Hay may refer to:

Helen Scott Hay (1869–1932), American nurse
Helen Hay Whitney (1876–1944), American  writer, socialite, and philanthropist
Helen Haye (1874–1957), British stage and film actress

See also
Helen Hayes (disambiguation)
Hay (surname)